Avksentyevo is the name of several rural localities in Kostroma Oblast, Russia:
Avksentyevo, Makaryevsky District, Kostroma Oblast, a village in Nikolo-Makarovskoye Settlement of Makaryevsky District; 
Avksentyevo, Manturovsky District, Kostroma Oblast, a village in Leontyevskoye Settlement of Manturovsky District; 
Avksentyevo, Neysky District, Kostroma Oblast, a village in Soltanovskoye Settlement of Neysky District;